Weberocereus is genus of cacti. It produces a green and white flower and is found mainly in Costa Rica and Nicaragua.

Description
The species of the genus Weberocereus grows climbing or hanging, epiphytic or lithophytic. Their shoots, which are round in cross-section, are angular or flattened. The 2 to 5 ribs have lobed or toothed margins on which are small, sparsely spined areoles. The spines are short and bristly or sometimes absent at all.

The bell-shaped to short funnel-shaped flowers that arise on the side of the shoots are mottled pink to yellowish white to green and 3 to 10 centimeters long. They open at night. The areoles on the pericarp and the flower tube are covered with bristly or hairy spines.

The spherical to oblong, fleshy, often bumpy fruits are red or yellow and bristly or glabrous. They contain white or purple flesh. The remainder of the flowers is perennial. The medium-sized, black-brown to black, slightly shiny seeds are oval and almost smooth. They are up to 1.8 millimeters long and 1.2 millimeters wide

Species
, Plants of the World Online accepted eight species:

Some species were transferred to Selenicereus in 2017:
 Weberocereus alliodorus Gómez-Hin. & H.M.Hern. → Selenicereus alliodorus
 Weberocereus glaber (Eichlam) G.D.Rowley → Selenicereus glaber
 Weberocereus tonduzii (F.A.C.Weber) G.D.Rowley → Selenicereus tonduzii

References

External links

Night-blooming plants
Cactoideae genera
 
Hylocereeae